Euprenolepis wittei is a Southeast Asian species of ant in the subfamily Formicinae.

References

Formicinae
Insects described in 2009
Hymenoptera of Asia